Yank may refer to:

 Yankee, a slang term, with various meanings, for someone of American origin. It is particularly used in a derogative sense, with connotations of someone from the USA who is arrogant and/or loud-mouthed.

Sports teams
 Boston Yanks, a National Football League team from 1944 to 1948
 New York Yanks, a National Football League team in 1950 and 1951, originally the Boston Yanks
 New York Yankees, a Major League Baseball team nicknamed the "Yanks"
 "The Yanks", a nickname for:
 United States men's national soccer team
 United States men's national under-23 soccer team
 United States men's national under-21 soccer team
 United States men's national under-20 soccer team
 United States men's national under-18 soccer team
 United States men's national under-17 soccer team
 United States women's national soccer team
 United States women's national under-23 soccer team
 United States women's national under-20 soccer team
 United States women's national under-17 soccer team

Arts and entertainment
 Yanks, a 1979 film
 The Yank, a 2014 American comedy film by Sean Lackey
 Yank!, an off-Broadway play about homosexual soldiers in World War II
 Yank, a 1940s comic book superhero, see Yank & Doodle
 Billy Yank, a protagonist in the 1950s comic strip Johnny Reb and Billy Yank

People
 Yank (nickname)
 Yank Porter (c. 1895-1944), American jazz drummer

Other uses
 Yank, the Army Weekly, a magazine for American soldiers during World War II
 USS Yank (SP-908), a US Navy patrol vessel from 1917 to 1919
 Yank (automobile), an unsuccessful American sports car produced in 1950
 Yank, nickname for the Queensland AC16 class locomotive
 The Yank, nickname of the prototype for the Waveney-class lifeboat
 Yanks Air Museum, Chino, California
 Yank (physics), a unit in physics (rate of change of force per unit time)
 Yank, the name for the copy command in vi and the paste command in Emacs, two commonly used UNIX/Linux text editors